The 2016 FIBA Europe Under-18 3x3 Championships was the second edition of the European Under-18 3x3 basketball event that features separate competitions for men's and women's national teams. The tournament started on 16 July 2016 with the start of two qualifying tournaments and its final tournament was played in Debrecen, Hungary from 9–11 September 2016.

France won an historic double as both their men's and women's teams took home gold for their first championship in this competition.

Qualification
The qualification events took place on 16–17 July 2016. A total of 26 men's teams and 22 women's teams took part in the two tournaments, with 12 teams of each gender qualifying for the final championship.

Men

Qualifier 1
The first qualifying tournament took place in Riga, Latvia from 16 to 17 July 2016. The top six teams qualified for the U-18 European Championships.

Group A

Group B

Group C

Group D

Bracket

The four quarterfinal winners (Slovenia, Latvia, Serbia, and Romania), plus the fifth and sixth-placed teams (Turkey and Germany), qualified for the U-18 European Championships.

Qualifier 2
The second qualifying tournament took place in Szolnok, Hungary from 16 to 17 July 2016. The top six teams qualified for the U-18 European Championships.

Group A

Group B

Group C

Group D

Bracket

The four quarterfinal winners (Czech Republic, Belgium, Hungary, and Georgia), plus the fifth and sixth-placed teams (France and Andorra), qualified for the U-18 European Championships.

Women

Qualifier 1
The first qualifying tournament took place in Riga, Latvia from 16 to 17 July 2016. The top five teams qualified for the U-18 European Championships.

Group A

Group B

Bracket

The four quarterfinal winners (Spain, Belgium, Russia, and Switzerland), plus the fifth-placed team (Netherlands), qualified for the U-18 European Championships.

Qualifier 2
The second qualifying tournament took place in Szolnok, Hungary from 16 to 17 July 2016. The top six teams, plus host Hungary, qualified for the U-18 European Championships.

Group A

Group B

Group C

Group D

Bracket

Hosts Hungary and the four quarterfinal winners (France, Lithuania, Czech Republic, and Israel), plus the fifth and sixth-placed teams (Belarus and Austria), qualified for the U-18 European Championships.

Final Tournament
The second edition of the FIBA 3x3 Under-18 European Championships was held in Debrecen, Hungary from 9 to 11 September 2016. A total of 12 teams of each gender qualified for the championship through one of two qualifying tournaments. Pools were announced on 9 August 2016.

France won an historic double as both their men's and women's teams took home gold for their first championship in this competition.

Qualified Teams

Men's teams
 (hosts)

Women's teams
 (hosts)

Men's tournament

Pool play
Pool A

Pool B

Pool C

Pool D

Knockout stage

Final standings

Women's tournament

Pool play
Pool A

Pool B

Pool C

Pool D

Knockout stage

Final standings

References

External links
Official website
3x3planet.com

2016
2016 in 3x3 basketball
2016–17 in Hungarian basketball
International basketball competitions hosted by Hungary
Sport in Debrecen
September 2016 sports events in Europe